Markus Kiesenebner (born 21 April 1979) is an Austrian former footballer who played as a defensive midfielder. He retired from active career in 2009 because of a serious knee injury. Since 2009 he is founder and chairman of MKI International Holding, Director of MK&P and Member of the Board of Austria Independent Group of Companies.

Club career
Markus Kiesenebner was born in Linz, started his career with hometown FC Linz, then he played for LASK Linz and when the two Linz sides merged under the LASK name, he moved to Austria Wien in 2001. In 2002-03 he returned to Upper Austria to the 1st League Champions SV Pasching by loan and in his two seasons at the Waldstadion he helped Pasching qualify for the UEFA Cup for the first time. Also in the UI-Cup competition they were very successful. With a 4:0 win at their home ground and the 1:1 in Bremen they reached the UI-Cup Final against FC Schalke 04. Markus Kiesenebner scored the goal against Werder Bremen (1:1)

This prompted renewed interest from Austria Wien and they cancelled the loan contract and ordered him back. Markus Kiesenebner played for Austria Wien as defensive midfielder, was at this time in 2006 Austrian Champions and ÖFB Cup winner. International, in 2004/05 he played with Austria Wien in the UEFA Cup group stage and played against Dnipro Dnipropetrovsk, Real Zaragoza, Club Brugge and Utrecht. Austria Wien reached the UEFA – Cup quarter finals with fantastic wins over Athletic Bilbao and Real Zaragoza but failed against FC Parma to go the next step to the semi-finals against CSKA Moscow. (UEFA Cup Winner 2004–2005)

On 1 June 2007, Kiesenebner signed for Norwegian Premier League club Lillestrøm SK, in a Bosman ruling. After his move to Lillestrøm, Kiesenebner has been severely troubled by injuries. He is estimated to be back to full fitness in April 2008. After yet a season troubled with injury in 2008, with little or no playing time at all, Kiesenebner and Lillestrøm came to an agreement to terminate the contract in November 2008. After two months without club he signed with SC Rheindorf Altach in January 2009.

International career
Markus Kiesenebner played 16 times for the Austrian U16 national team and scored 3 goals, 22 caps for the Austrian U18 national team with 1 goal and 21 times for the Austrian U21 national team and he scored 3 times.
He made his debut for Austria in an April 2004 friendly  match against Luxembourg and has earned 12 caps, scoring one goal.

International goals
Scores and results list Luxembourg's goal tally first.

Honours
Austrian Football Bundesliga (1):
 2006
Austrian Cup (3):
 2005, 2006, 2007
Norwegian Cup (1):
 2007
Austrian Supercup (1):
 2005

Business
Established in 2009, Markus Kiesenebner is founder and chairman of MKI International Holding. MKI International Holding is a global operating company based in the United Arab Emirates. MKI develops and manages an extensive portfolio of companies focused on sports management, sports projects, real estate, financial instruments, project investments, air transportation, hospitality, artworks,... Markus Kiesenebner is also Member of the Board of the Private Network - Austria Independent Group. In 2013 Markus Kiesenebner founded also his own Brand with the name MK21.

References

External links
Player profile - Austria Archive

Footballers from Linz
Austrian footballers
Austria international footballers
LASK players
FK Austria Wien players
SC Rheindorf Altach players
Lillestrøm SK players
Austrian expatriate footballers
Expatriate footballers in Norway
Austrian expatriate sportspeople in Norway
Austrian Football Bundesliga players
Eliteserien players
1979 births
Living people
Association football midfielders
Austrian sports agents